The 2015 2014–2016 CAVB Beach Volleyball Continental Cup were a beach volleyball double-gender event. The winners of the event will qualify for the 2016 Summer Olympics

Men

Round 1

1st and 2nd placed advanced to 2nd round

Round 2

1st, 2nd, and 3rd placed advanced to 3rd round.

Women

Round 1

1st and 2nd place advanced to 2nd round

Round 2

1st, 2nd, and 3rd placed advanced to 3rd round.

External links
Official website

2014 in beach volleyball
2015 in beach volleyball
2016 in beach volleyball
Continental Beach Volleyball Cup